The Giro al Sas, also known as the Giro Podistico di Trento and the Giro Internazionale Città di Trento, is an annual 10-kilometre road running competition for men which takes place in October in the city of Trento, Italy.

First held as a part of celebrations for Saint Vigilius of Trent in 1907, the competition was interrupted by World Wars but has been held virtually every year since 1945. This makes it one of Europe's longest-running competitions of its type. The race has been won by some of Italy's most successful long-distance runners, including Stefano Baldini, as well as elite foreign athletes such as Paul Tergat and Kenenisa Bekele.

The race is held within the city centre and starts and finishes at Piazza del Duomo. The name of the race, roughly translated as the Sas Circuit, derives from the fact that the course features ten kilometre-long loops on the main city streets – which are locally referred to as al Sas.

The running event should not be confused with the similarly named Giro del Trentino – a road cycling competition which the city has hosted since 1963.

History
The history of the competition can be traced back to 1907 when a community group organised a race on the city streets of roughly 6 km as part of the festival of Saint Vigilius of Trent. Domenico Gottin, a runner from Veneto, was the first to cross the line but he was later disqualified for taking a short cut, leaving Isidoro Trenner (a member of the local sports club) as the winner of the inaugural race. The race became an annual tradition, although it ceased during World War I.

It re-emerged in the post-war period and gained its current moniker of the Giro al Sas at this point – a name roughly meaning the Sas Circuit, which derived from the race's looped course on the city's main streets which were known as the Sas. The running competition was placed on hiatus from 1940–44 due to World War II. The Giro al Sas returned to the streets in November 1945, just months after the Italy's surrender to the Allied Forces.

After the wars, the race entered a new, uninterrupted era (with the exception of 1991 and 1996) and gradually became international in nature with elite athlete competition. Alongside other Italian races, such as the Giro di Castelbuono, it is among the oldest road running competitions which continue to the present day. The current race director is Gianni Demadonna, a former athlete and athletics manager who won the race three times in his running career. Among the prominent competitors of the race's history is Stefano Baldini, the 2004 Olympic marathon champion, who competed in 18 editions and won on three occasions. He set the 2010 race as his final outing of his successful career, although an injury forced him to miss of the competition. Other significant winners include Franjo Mihalić, Francesco Panetta, Paul Tergat, and Kenenisa Bekele.

Course and records

The course of the race has varied through its history: it was a 15 km race in the 1960s, before existing as a 12 km circuit from 1970 to the mid-1990s. From 1997 to 2004, the race typically featured ten laps spanning 10.9 km. It has been a 10 km race from 2005 to present. The current course of ten 1 km laps features many twists and bends as it traces a circular loop around the central city streets, making fast times difficult to achieve in the Trento race.

Paul Kimaiyo Kimugul of Kenya holds the fastest time for the 10 km distance via his winning run of 28:00 minutes from 2005. Over the 10.9 km circuit, another Kenyan – Paul Kosgei Malakwen – has the course record with 30:46 minutes. Although it has almost exclusively been a men's race only for its entire history, a women's competition was added to the programme for the 2005 edition – this 10 km race was won in 33:15 minutes by Bruna Genovese, an Italian professional marathon runner.

Past winners
Little information about the race (or its winners) in its early history is available and the modern competition regards its post-war rebirth in 1945 as the start of its modern, continuous lineage.

Key:

Statistics

Winners by country

Multiple winners

See also
BOclassic
Memorial Peppe Greco

References

List of winners
Malcolm Heyworth et al. (2010-10-12). Giro al Sas 10 km. Association of Road Racing Statisticians. Retrieved on 2010-11-03.

External links
Official website

10K runs
Athletics competitions in Italy
Recurring sporting events established in 1907
Sport in Trentino
Trento
Men's athletics competitions
Autumn events in Italy